The Iowa Court of Appeals is the intermediate-level appellate court of the state of Iowa. Its purpose is to review appeals from trial court decisions which are referred to the court by the Iowa Supreme Court. The court decides the vast majority of appeals filed from trial courts in the state of Iowa, and its decisions are final unless further review is granted by the Iowa Supreme Court.

Judges of the court
The court is composed of nine judges. Each judge is appointed for one year by the governor, from a list of nominees composed by the State Judicial Nominating Commission. The judge will then serve a one-year term before facing a retention election. If the judge is reelected, his/her term will normally be six years. The retirement age is 72, after which some judges take senior status.

The judges elect the Chief Judge from among themselves every two years. The chief judge functions as the administrative head of the court.

, the nine judges of the Iowa Court of Appeals are:
Chief Judge Thomas N. Bower, appointed by Terry Branstad on December 8, 2011.
Judge Anuradha Vaitheswaran, appointed by Tom Vilsack on August 16, 1999.
Judge Mary E. Tabor, appointed by Chet Culver on April 28, 2010.
Judge Sharon Soorholtz Greer, appointed by Kim Reynolds on April 27, 2019. 
Judge Julie Schumacher, appointed by Kim Reynolds on August 29, 2019.
Judge Paul B. Ahlers, appointed by Kim Reynolds on November 27, 2019.
Judge Gina Badding, appointed by Kim Reynolds on July 22, 2021.
Judge Mary Chicchelly, appointed by Kim Reynolds on December 7, 2021.
Judge Tyler Buller, appointed by Kim Reynolds on October 26, 2022.

Former judges
Terry L. Huitink (1994-2008)

See also
 Courts of Iowa

References

External links
Homepage of the Iowa Court of Appeals
Judges of the Iowa Court of Appeals

Iowa state courts
State appellate courts of the United States
Courts and tribunals with year of establishment missing